William John McCart (August 7, 1872 – 1933) was an Ontario merchant and political figure. He represented Stormont in the Legislative Assembly of Ontario from 1902 to 1904 and from 1908 to 1911 as a Liberal member.

He was born in Port Henry, New York, the son of John McCart. He was educated in Brockville, Ontario. He was employed as a clerk with companies in Finch and Maxville, before establishing his own business in Maxville. He later opened a general store in Avonmore. McCart married Wilmena Steele in 1892. He was defeated in the 1905 election but was reelected in 1908. McCart later moved to Toronto where he established a wholesale business dealing in fruit. He drowned at Cornwall in 1933.

External links 
 
 
 

1872 births
1933 deaths
Ontario Liberal Party MPPs
People from the United Counties of Stormont, Dundas and Glengarry